Essam Wel Mesbah is an Egyptian animated comedy television series for young people.

Premise 
The series revolves around the brother of the legendary hero Alaa El-Din (Aladdin) known but he lives in our time and postpones all his dreams and ambitions until he can find a magic lamp like his brother. He is therefore lazy and not industrious in his study, which causes his relationship with his friends, parents and teachers to deteriorate.

One day he finds an actual magic lamp and comes out of it "reap" Genie of a new type, as it is necessary to find him to achieve his dreams, forcing Essam to strive to achieve the demands of the genie, which teaches many things and develops from his character so that he learns at the end of the episodes that the realization of dreams of work and science and grandfather, and not magic lamps and superstition.

It aired in six seasons during Ramadan of 2011, 2012, 2016, 2017, and 2018, and 2022.

Cast
 Essam: Ahmed El-Fishawy (season 1), Moustafa Amar (seasons 2-6)
 Jasmine: Donia Samir Ghanem (season 1), Dorra Zarrouk (season 2), Nesma Mahgoub (season 3), Randa El Behery (season 4), Randa El Behery (Sesson 5), Mai Ezz Eldin (season 6)
 Shafiq: Mohi Ismail (seasons 1-3), Mohamed Abdel Moati (seasons 4-6)
 Uncle Atman: Mohamed Farid
 Sensena: Moataz Abdel Sabour (season 1), Engy Wegdan (seasons 2-6)
 Gargul: Ashraf Mahdi
 Miss Anshrah: Aida Fahmy
 Uncle Faraj: Mohammed Al-Dandani
 Uncle Saket: Bayoumi Fouad
 Awatif: Ola Rushdie (seasons 2-6)
 Hadi: Amy Samir Ghanem (seasons 1-3), Mona Aboul Gheit (seasons 4-6)
 Nakhla: Shehab Ibrahim (seasons 2-6)
 Captain Mohsen:Mahmoud Amer (season 1-3), Ashraf Mahdi (seasons 4-6)

External links
 Season 1 page on El Cinema
 Season 2 page on El Cinema
 Season 3 page on El Cinema
 Season 4 page on El Cinema
 Season 5 page on El Cinema 
 Season 6 page on El Cinema

References

2020s children's television series
2020s Egyptian television series
2010s children's television series
2010s Egyptian television series
2009 Egyptian television series debuts